Morne-à-l'Eau 2nd Canton is a former canton in the Arrondissement of Pointe-à-Pitre on the island of Guadeloupe. It had 7,089 inhabitants (2012). It was disbanded following the French canton reorganisation which came into effect in March 2015. It comprised part of the commune of Morne-à-l'Eau, which joined the new canton of Morne-à-l'Eau in 2015.

See also
Cantons of Guadeloupe
Communes of Guadeloupe
Arrondissements of Guadeloupe

References

Former cantons of Guadeloupe
2015 disestablishments in France
States and territories disestablished in 2015